The Chaotian or Chaotien Temple, officially the Chao-Tian Temple, is a temple to the Chinese Goddess Mazu in Beigang Township, Yunlin County, Taiwan. Constructed in 1700, it became one of the most important Mazu temples in Taiwan and is known for its extravagant temple architecture. It is visited by more than a million pilgrims every year.

Mazuism
Mazu, the deified form of the medieval Lin Moniang from Fujian, has an enthusiastic following on Taiwan. Beigang was one of the most important Taiwanese ports in the 17th century. As Beigang and its economy grew, at the same time the temple grew and expanded. Today the Chaotian Temple at Beigang is an important religious site and pilgrimage destination. Beigang's Mazu tours to other Mazu temples through whole Taiwan every year for visits and inspections.

History
In 1694, a Buddhist monk named Shubi requested that a statue of Mazu be brought to Beigang from the Chaotian Temple in her hometown of Meizhou in Fujian. In 1700, Chen Li-Shum donated a building lot and raised the funds to erect Beigang's own Chaotian Temple. In 1730, the temple was further expanded. In 1770, Penkang Magistrate Hsueh Chao-heng considered that the temple too simple to live up to the dignity of Goddess Matsu. Three years later another reconstruction of the temple started. In 1854 a number of ranking officials initiated a third project, expanding the temple into a palace-type architectural complex. The front wing consisted of worship courtyard and east and west chambers. The second wing was for worship of the Heavenly Mother, third wing for Goddess of mercy; east wing for San-Kuan Heavenly Emperors, west wing for Wenchang God, the 4th wing for Goddess Matsu's parents; east wing for Goddess of Childgiving and west wing, Lang God. Several renovation followed in the 20th century.

Beigang Wind Orchestra
The Beigang Wind Orchestra was founded in 1928 by Chen Chia-Hu. On spiritual days the orchestra marches for the Chaotian temple.

Cultural activities
The Chaotian Temple also owns a cultural hall, where concert, dances and other activities take place. On top of the building is a statue of Mazu. The Chaotian Temple also sponsors events like the Beigang International Music Festival. Since 2020 and the beginning of the COVID-19 pandemic, a Buddhist Liberation Rite of Water and Land is sponsored by Chaotian Temple to pray for the eradication of the virus.

See also
 Qianliyan & Shunfeng'er
 List of Mazu temples around the world
 Baishatun Mazu Pilgrimage
 Gongfan Temple
 Xiluo Guangfu Temple
 Gongtian Temple, Miaoli County
 Nanyao Temple, Changhua County
 Bengang Tianhou Temple, Chiayi County
 List of temples in Taiwan
 Religion in Taiwan

References

Further reading

External links

 Chaotian Temple website
 

1694 establishments in Taiwan
Religious buildings and structures completed in 1694
Mazu temples in Yunlin County
Mazu temples built by Buddhists
National monuments of Taiwan